Basic salivary proline-rich protein 3 is a protein that in humans is encoded by the PRB3 gene.

The protein encoded by this gene is a proline-rich salivary protein. It is a major constituent of parotid saliva. This protein is proposed to act as a bacterial receptor. This gene and five other genes that also encode salivary proline-rich proteins (PRPs), as well as a gene encoding a lacrimal gland PRP, form a PRP gene cluster in the chromosomal 12p13 region.

References

Further reading

Salivary proline-rich proteins